Dr Manhattan is an alternative rock album recorded by American band Dr Manhattan and released on March 11, 2008, by Vagrant Records. The first single off this record is "Big Chomper, Big Chomper". The song's music video premiered on mtvU on August 25, 2008. The album marks a departure from the band's early post-hardcore sound, yet features a few re-recordings of tracks from the group's demo EP, such as "The Party's Opinion" and "To Feel Cozy Surrounded by Cats".

Track listing 
"Big Chomper, Big Chomper" - 3:15
"You Put The I In Team" - 4:55
"Dirty, Scandalous, Dirty" - 4:02
"Claims Should Echo" - 3:10
"Gunpowder: A Ballet" - 5:07
"The Party's Opinion" - 2:39
"Tracey's Buns" - 3:14
"To Feel Cozy Surrounded By Cats" - 3:34
"Baton Rouge" - 4:17
"Minds Like Ours" - 4:56
"Pepper" - 4:53

References

2008 debut albums
Dr Manhattan (band) albums
Vagrant Records albums